Palasan is one of the constituent barangays in the city of Valenzuela, Metro Manila, Philippines.

Festivals
Palasan celebrates its fiesta every first Sunday of May for their patron saint, Sta. Cruz.

Landmarks

Establishments in the area include the Pio Valenzuela Elementary School, Polo National High School and San Diego de Alcala Parish Church, and Palasan River.

As of today, a lot of business establishments build around the vicinity, which are:

Lasam's Diner
Kubyertos
TeaTone
PresidenTea
Rapsa Ramen
Eboy's Manok
Andok's
Chooks-to-Go
Yin Yang Milk Tea
Juancibo & Gungjeon

References

External links
Valenzuela, Philippines official site

Barangays of Metro Manila
Valenzuela, Metro Manila